Hobscheid is a town in western Luxembourg. It is part of the commune of Habscht, in the canton of Capellen, which is part of the district of Luxembourg.

Hobscheid was the administrative centre of a commune by the same name until 2018, when it was merged with the commune of Septfontaines to form the commune of Habscht.

Former commune
The former commune consisted of the villages:

 Eischen
 Hobscheid (Habscht)

External links
 

 
Towns in Luxembourg
Former communes of Luxembourg